Dr. H. Richard Winn  is an American neurosurgeon and Professor of Neurosurgery and Neuroscience at Mount Sinai School of Medicine. Dr. Winn was Chairman of Neurological Surgery at the University of Washington School of Medicine from 1983-2002. Winn has made numerous contributions to the field of neurosurgery, specifically to the physiology of cerebral blood flow regulation and clinical studies of the natural history of cerebral aneurysms.  A leading international Neurosurgical Prize is named after Dr. Winn.

Career

Training
H. Richard Winn, MD, trained in Neurological Surgery at the University of Virginia in Charlottesville under John A. Jane, MD, PhD. During residency he spent a year in England at Atkinson Morley's Hospital and had the opportunity start clinical research on the natural history of cerebral aneurysms working with Alan Richardson and pursuing long-term outcome studies initiated by Sir Wylie McKissock. Following military service with the US Army in Germany, Dr. Winn returned to Charlottesville where he pursued basic science training in cardiovascular and cerebrovascular physiology under the direction of Robert M. Berne, Professor of Physiology and began his studies on the role of adenosine and cerebral blood flow regulation. He has been continuously funded by the NIH since 1974 for this ongoing effort.

Positions
Dr. Winn held faculty positions in the Departments of Neurosurgery and Physiology at the University of Virginia, rising to full Professor and Vice Chairman of Neurological Surgery until 1983 when he moved to University of Washington as the Professor and Chairman of the Department of Neurological Surgery with joint Professorship in the Department of Physiology and Biophysics. On July 16th, 2002 Dr. Winn pleaded guilty to obstructing a criminal investigation into inflated billings and creating an "atmosphere of fear and intimidation" within his department.  
In July 2002, as part of the agreement. Dr. Winn resigned his position as Chairman of the Neurosurgery Department at the University of Washington.  In addition to the $500,000 fine handed down at Dr. Winn's sentencing, he was ordered to perform 1,000 hours of community service. A request to perform the mandated community service in Nepal was granted.  In 2003, after spending several months as a Visiting Professor in the Department of Surgery (Neurosurgery) at Tribhuvan University Teaching Hospital in Kathmandu, Nepal, he moved to Mount Sinai Medical School where he was appointed as a tenured Professor in the Departments of Neurosurgery and Neuroscience.  In 2010, Dr. Winn was appointed Director of Neurosurgery at Lenox Hill Hospital (NYC) and in 2013 returned to Mount Sinai with appointments in Neurosurgery and Neuroscience.

Awards
Dr. Winn was awarded a Jacob Javits Neuroscience Investigator Award from the NIH. Other honors include being selected a Fellow of the American Association for the Advancement of Science (1992) "for studies in cerebral metabolism and for pioneering investigations defining the physiologic regulation of brain blood flow," the Wakeman Award for Research in the Neurosciences (1990), the Sir Wylie McKissock Neuroscience Prize (1992) from St. George's Medical School, London and the Grass Foundation Award (1999) from the Society of Neurological Surgery "for excellence in research contributions in the areas of science and academic neurosurgery." He also received the Distinguished Alumnus Award from the Haverford School (2000) and the Distinguished Service Award from the Society of Neurological Surgeons (2005). .

The Winn Prize
The H. Richard Winn, M.D. Prize is an annual award established in presented by of the Society of Neurological Surgeons to encourage research in the neurosciences and to recognize outstanding, continuous commitment to research in the neurosciences by a neurological surgeon. The Society of Neurological Surgeons is the American society of leaders in neurosurgical residency education, and is the oldest neurosurgical society in the world.

References

American neurosurgeons
University of Virginia alumni
University of Virginia School of Medicine faculty
University of Washington faculty
Icahn School of Medicine at Mount Sinai faculty
1943 births
Living people
Haverford School alumni